Econoline Crush is a Canadian rock band from Vancouver, British Columbia, formed in 1992. They have released four studio albums and two studio EPs, and are best known for their charting singles such as "You Don't Know What It's Like", "Home", "Surefire (Never Enough)", "All That You Are (X3)", "Make It Right", and "Dirty". They achieved platinum status with the 1997 album The Devil You Know and also received two Juno nominations, in 1995 for Purge and in 1998 for The Devil You Know.

Vocalist Trevor Hurst has been the only consistent member of the band since its formation.

Band history

Early years, Purge, and Affliction (1992–1996)
Econoline Crush was formed in 1992 when singer Trevor Hurst moved to Vancouver from Seattle after he answered an ad seeking a vocalist in the local Seattle newspaper, The Rocket, placed by Chris Meyers. Tom Ferris (previously known for the band Moev) and Meyers had been advertising and searching for a vocalist before Hurst contacted Meyers from Seattle. The trio began writing demos alongside guitarist Robbie Morfitt and bassist Dan Yarmeko. The band released a demo EP in 1993. At the end of the year, Ferris (who had songwriting credits on the next two releases) and Meyers had left the band, and Econoline Crush signed a record deal with EMI Music Canada, after playing only 26 shows total. Shortly after, drummer Gregg Leask and guitarist Hack had joined the band.

In 1994, the band released their first EP called Purge, with producer Dale Penner and keyboardist/programmer Rhys Fulber. "T.D.M." was the only song to be released as a single, and its music video aired sporadically on the television program MuchOnDemand. In 1995, the band gained their first nomination for a Juno Award in Canada for Purge.

Econoline Crush released its full-length album Affliction without guitarist Hack on March 21, 1995, in Canada. The album was produced by Fulber, and contained the singles "Nowhere Now", "Wicked", and "Close". The band then embarked on an extensive Canadian tour. They also toured Europe three times, with The Young Gods, Die Krupps, and Waltari, culminating in an appearance at the POP KOMM Festival in Köln, Germany with Filter. The album was then released in early 1996 on the band's new U.S. label Nettwerk Records. While touring behind the album in the U.S., they added second guitarist David "Ziggy" Sigmund to the lineup. Towards the end of the year, the band signed with the management group Bruce Allen Talent, and started recording at Sound City with producer Sylvia Massy, who had worked with Prince, Red Hot Chili Peppers, and Tool.

The Devil You Know and mainstream success (1997–2000)
In 1997, Econoline Crush released The Devil You Know. They embarked on a tour with KISS, Foo Fighters, Green Day, The Tea Party, and other bands. For the album's U.S. release, Econoline Crush departed from Nettwerk Records, and instead signed with Restless Records. The U.S. release occurred in the spring of 1998, and they went again on tour with KISS, Stabbing Westward, God Lives Underwater, among others.

During the recording of the album and after it was released, the lineup had changed numerous times. Keyboardist Fulber was no longer involved with the band, and Eric "Statik" Anest (from the band Collide) briefly contributed keyboards. Bassist Yaremko left the band during recording to join singer-songwriter Bif Naked and then rejoined late in the touring cycle (with Don Binns, Ken Fleming, and then Thom Christiansen filling in). Drummer Leask left the band after the Affliction tours and was replaced by Robert Wagner (only to be replaced himself by Nico Quintal and then Johnny Haro during the tours). Also, guitarist Morfitt was briefly in the band alongside Sigmund, but Morfitt left after the touring ended for The Devil You Know.

The single "All That You Are (X3)" had charted highly in both the U.S. (#18 on Billboard's Hot Mainstream Rock chart) and Canada (#12 on RPM's Hot 100 chart and #9 on RPM's Alternative 30 chart). The singles "Home" and "Surefire (Never Enough)" had also found moderate airplay in both countries. The band received their second Juno nomination in 1998 due to The Devil You Know, and performed live at the televised Juno ceremony. The album also received gold and platinum awards. In December 1999, "You Don't Know What It's Like" was released as a successful single and was included on MuchMusic's Big Shiny Tunes 4. Overall it had peaked at #13 on RPM's Alternative 30 chart and at #29 on Billboard's Hot Mainstream Rock chart (it was also re-released in 2001 to support the next album).

During this time, some of the band's songs appeared on television shows, including Melrose Place, Psi Factor, The Crow: Stairway to Heaven, and ESPN, among others. In addition, the 1999 Sony PlayStation game Sled Storm featured mix versions of the songs "Sparkle and Shine", "Nowhere Now", and "Surefire (Never Enough)".

Brand New History and hiatus (2001–2005)
The band went to California to work on their next album with producers John Travis, Bob Rock, and DJ Swamp, which included collaborations with Chris Vrenna (formerly from Nine Inch Nails) and Paul Raven (Killing Joke, Prong, and Ministry). In 2001, the band released Brand New History to mixed reviews, despite some moderate commercial success. The lineup was solidified with Hurst, Yaremko, Sigmund, and Haro, alongside second guitarist Mark Peterson late in the touring cycle. The album contained the charting single "Make It Right" and the previously-released "You Don't Know What It's Like".

Across Canada, Econoline Crush and rapper Kardinal Offishall supported Godsmack on a tour; however, both openers were not warmly received by the heavy metal crowd. In the middle of 2002, the band's U.S. label Restless Records was purchased by Rykodisk, which was already undergoing internal restructuring. The mixed reception of their last album, the ill-fated tours, and the eventual lack of label support caused the band to enter an extended hiatus.

The band members focused on other projects. Yaremko rejoined Bif Naked's backing band for a brief period, and then had multiple stints with the punk rock band D.O.A. Haro teamed up with Stabbing Westward vocalist Christopher Hall to form The Dreaming. Sigmund embarked on a solo career and later moved to California. Hurst started working on a new band alongside former Collective Soul guitarist Ross Childress, initially called Early Moses; however, due to a legal dispute, it was then changed to simply Hurst.

Reunion, Ignite, and The People Have Spoken, Vol. 1 (2006–2011)
In December 2006, Econoline Crush reformed to play sporadic one-off shows, although only Hurst and Yaremko from the previous lineups stayed. Afterwards, Hurst announced on his MySpace page that he was working on a new Econoline Crush record, while the band started touring with Hinder. The new lineup of the band was drummer Brent Fitz, bassist Scott Whalen, guitarist Kai Markus, and Hurst. Hurst and Markus (who had worked with Noise Therapy and Methods of Mayhem) co-wrote the songs for the new album, which was recorded at Radiostar Studios in California. The album, Ignite, was released on January 15, 2008. The singles "Get Out of the Way" and "Dirty" both appeared on RPM's Alternative 30 chart in Canada, with the latter peaking at #13. Shortly after, the band went on tour with Three Days Grace and Seether. In August 2008, they went on another tour with 3 Doors Down, Staind, and Hinder, followed by a tour with Alice Cooper in September and October 2008. In 2009 the band played at festivals across Canada, including the Halifax Rocks Festival, with KISS, on July 18.

In April 2010 it was announced that both Robbie Morfitt and Ziggy Sigmund were back playing guitar. The band embarked on a summer tour in 2010, joined by drummer Greg Williamson and bassist Steve Vincent, both from Alberta's Tupelo Honey. EMI then released Surefire: The Best of Econoline Crush on December 21, 2010. The band released their EP The People Have Spoken, Vol. 1 on April 8, 2011. Afterwards, Morfitt had left the band again.

When the Devil Drives and future plans (2012–present)
On September 17, 2017, the band performed during Calgary's fifth annual Rally for Recovery Day while also Hurst shared his story of addiction and recovery. It was the third show of a weekend run that introduced drummer Dayvid Swart and guitarist Graham Tuson, while original bassist Yaremko briefly rejoined.

In a Facebook post in August 2019, the band announced new music would be released and shared a trailer for a documentary about Hurst's work as a registered nurse, titled Flatlander. In 2020, the band shared a new song, a re-working of "Get Out of the Way" from 2008's Ignite album. Another new song followed, titled "Fight Like the Devil". Both songs were due to appear on the newest album called When the Devil Drives.

On March 8, 2022, Sigmund unexpectedly died. It was initially revealed on Econoline Crush's official social media outlets. No cause of death was reported.

Members

Current members
Trevor Hurst - vocals (1992–2002, 2006–present)
Dayvid Swart - drums (2017–present)
Troy Zak - bass (2019–present)
Dan Garrison - guitar (2020–present)

Former members
Tom Ferris - keyboards (1992–1993)
Chris Meyers - drums (1992–1993)
Dan Yaremko - bass (1992–1997, 1998–2002, 2006–2007, 2017–2019) 
Robbie Morfitt - guitar (1992–1999, 2010–2015) 
Hack - guitar (1993–1994) 
Gregg Leask - drums (1993–1996) 
Rhys Fulber - keyboards (1993–1996) 
David "Ziggy" Sigmund - guitar (1996–2002, 2010–2022; died 2022)
Robert Wagner - drums (1996–1997) 
Don Binns - bass (1997) 
Eric "Statik" Anest - keyboards (1997)
Ken Fleming - bass (1997)
Thom Christiansen - bass (1997–1998)
Nico Quintal - drums (1997–1999)
Johnny Haro - drums (1999–2002) 
Mark Peterson - guitar (2001–2002)
Jay Benison - drums (2006–2007)
Dave Heese - guitar (2006–2007)
Mark Gomulinski - bass (2007)
Harvey Warren - drums (2007)
Brent Fitz - drums (2007–2009) 
Kai Markus - guitar (2007–2009) 
Scott Whalen - bass (2007–2010) 
Sean McKay - keyboards (2009)
Adam Percy - keyboards (2009)
Nik Pesut - drums (2009)
Ron Chamberlain - guitar (2009–2010)
Steve Vincent - bass (2010–2015) 
Greg Williamson - drums (2010–2017) 
Alex Varughese - bass (2015–2017)
Kyle Shaw - keyboards (2015–2017)
Aaron Skiba - guitar (2015–2017)
Graham Tuson - guitar (2017–2020)
Ben Yardley - guitar (2022)

Timeline
Color denotes main live duty.

Discography

Studio albums

EPs

Compilation albums

Singles

See also
List of alternative music artists

Music of Canada
Music of Manitoba
Canadian rock
List of Canadian musicians
List of bands from Canada
:Category:Canadian musical groups
List of alternative music artists

References

External links
CanConRox bio
Allmusic entry for Econoline Crush
 
 Econoline Crush on Facebook

Musical groups established in 1992
Musical groups disestablished in 2001
Musical groups reestablished in 2007
Canadian industrial music groups
Industrial rock musical groups
Musical groups from Seattle
Musical groups from Vancouver
Canadian alternative rock groups
Canadian post-grunge groups
1992 establishments in British Columbia
2001 disestablishments in British Columbia
2007 establishments in British Columbia
Restless Records artists
Nettwerk Music Group artists